Cheung Kin Fung (born 1 January 1984 in Hong Kong) is a former Hong Kong professional footballer who played as a left back.

Career statistics

Club
As of 11 September 2009

International
 As of 1 September 2016

Honours

Club
Kitchee
Hong Kong Premier League: 2014–15
Hong Kong First Division: 2013–14
Hong Kong Senior Shield: 2005–06
Hong Kong FA Cup: 2012–13, 2014–15
HKFA League Cup: 2005–06, 2006–07, 2014–15

Pegasus
Hong Kong Senior Shield: 2008–09
Hong Kong FA Cup: 2009–10

External links
 
 

1984 births
Living people
Hong Kong footballers
Association football defenders
Hong Kong Premier League players
Hong Kong Rangers FC players
Kitchee SC players
TSW Pegasus FC players
Sun Hei SC players
South China AA players
Eastern Sports Club footballers
Yuen Long FC players
Footballers at the 2002 Asian Games
Footballers at the 2006 Asian Games
Asian Games competitors for Hong Kong
Hong Kong football managers